Rodondo Island is a granite island, part of the Rodondo Group, lying in northern Bass Strait, within the state boundaries of Tasmania, Australia.

Flora and fauna
It is a nature reserve with a breeding colony of over one million mutton birds or short-tailed shearwaters.

Rodondo's vegetation communities include Disphyma herbfield, Stipa tussock grassland, Poa poiformis tussock grassland, Melaleuca armillaris low closed forest, Allocasuarina verticillata low open forest, clifftop shrubland, and Eucalyptus globulus open forest.

As well as the shearwaters, recorded breeding seabird and wader species include little penguin, fairy prion, Pacific gull and sooty oystercatcher.  White-bellied sea-eagles have nested on the island.  The island is part of the Wilsons Promontory Islands Important Bird Area, identified as such by BirdLife International because of its importance for breeding seabirds.  Reptiles present include the metallic skink, White's skink and southern water skink, Rodondo being the only place the latter has been recorded on Tasmanian territory.

History
The island was sighted by Lieutenant James Grant on 9 December 1800 from the survey brig  and named "from its resemblance to that rock, well known to all seamen in the West Indies", presumably Redonda, between the islands of Montserrat and Nevis.

The first landing was in January 1947 when a party led by John Béchervaise spent a week exploring the island and surveying its natural history.

See also

List of islands of Tasmania

References

Islands of Northern Tasmania
Protected areas of Tasmania
Important Bird Areas of Tasmania
Islands of Bass Strait